Eastern Rebellion 2 is an album by Eastern Rebellion led pianist Cedar Walton which was recorded in early 1977 and released on the Dutch Timeless label.

Reception

AllMusic awarded the album 4 stars noting "The music is unassuming, without theatrics or extended technique, and as a result may get lost in the shuffle. This is, however, a polished and pleasing set by first-rate talent, and it achieves its goal of exciting, mainstream fare with a 1970s flair".

Track listing 
All compositions by Cedar Walton
 "Fantasy in D" – 6:52    
 "The Maestro" – 4:41    
 "Ojos de Rojo" – 6:56    
 "Sunday Suite" – 17:54
 "Clockwise" – 5:00 Bonus track on CD    
 "Firm Roots" – 7:34 Bonus track on CD

Personnel 
Cedar Walton – piano 
Bob Berg – tenor saxophone
Sam Jones – bass
Billy Higgins – drums
Curtis Fuller – trombone (tracks 5 & 6)

References 

Eastern Rebellion albums
1977 albums
Timeless Records albums